Designing Virtual Worlds is a book about the practice of virtual world development by Richard Bartle.  It has been noted as an authoritative source regarding the history of world-based online games. College courses have been taught using it.

In 2021, the author made the book freely available under a Creative Commons license on his website.

Contents
Designing Virtual Worlds argues that the fundamentals of player relationships to the virtual world and each other are independent of technical issues and are characterized by a blending of online and offline identity. According to the book, it is the designer's role to know what will provide players with a positive game experience, the purpose of virtual worlds is the player's exploration of self, as well as for its expansion of the earlier 4-type Bartle gamer style taxonomy into an 8-type model. The book also focuses on the practicalities of its subject.

Reception

It has been called "the bible of MMORPG design" and spoken of as "excellent", "seminal", "widely read", "the standard text on the subject", "the most comprehensive guide to gaming virtual worlds" and "a foundation text for researchers and developers of virtual worlds" that is "strongly recommended for anyone actually thinking about building one of these places" and "describes the minimum level of competency you should have when discussing design issues for virtual worlds".

In less favorable reception, one reviewer, while calling it a "must-read" work, said he found "much that was questionable, incomplete, or just erroneous" in it.

References

External links
 Preview at Google Books
 Author's support site
 Designing Virtual Worlds freely downloadable PDF under the Creative Commons CC BY-NC-ND 4.0 license

Books about the Internet
Books about video games
MUD texts
Texts related to the history of the Internet